Gherghița is a commune in Prahova County, Muntenia, Romania. It is composed of four villages: Gherghița, Independența, Malamuc and Ungureni. It also included Fânari, Olari and Olarii Vechi villages until 2004, when they were split off to form Olari Commune.

References

Communes in Prahova County
Localities in Muntenia